Victor Hendrix (22 September 1935 – 16 April 2020) was a West German rower who represented the United Team of Germany. He competed at the 1960 Summer Olympics in Rome with the men's coxless four where they were eliminated in the round one repechage.

References

1935 births
2020 deaths
West German male rowers
Olympic rowers of the United Team of Germany
Rowers at the 1960 Summer Olympics
Sportspeople from Neuss
European Rowing Championships medalists
20th-century German people